Kazemi Expressway starts from Zam-zam Square and goes south and ends in Jahad Square.

Expressways in Tehran